Admiral Field may refer to:

Arthur Mostyn Field (1855–1950), British Royal Navy admiral
Edward Field (Royal Navy officer) (1828–1912), British Royal Navy admiral
Frederick Field (Royal Navy officer) (1871–1945), British Royal Navy admiral

See also
Evelyn J. Fields (born 1949), National Oceanic and Atmospheric Administration Commissioned Officer Corps rear admiral